The 1974–75 Segunda División season saw 20 teams participate in the second flight Spanish league. Real Oviedo, Racing de Santander and Sevilla FC were promoted to Primera División. Barakaldo CF, RCD Mallorca, CD Orense, CE Sabadell FC and Cultural Leonesa were relegated to Tercera División.

Teams

Final table

Results

Relegation playoff

Pichichi Trophy for top goalscorers

External links 
  Official LFP Site

Segunda División seasons
2
Spain